{{Speciesbox
| image = Barbus camptacanthus (top), Barbus miolepis (bottom) - Royal Museum for Central Africa - DSC06872.JPG
| image_caption = Enteromius miolepis (bottom)
| status = LC
| status_system = IUCN3.1
| status_ref = 
| display_parents = 3
| genus = Enteromius
| species = miolepis
| authority = Boulenger, 1902
| synonyms = 
Barbus miolepis Boulenger, 1902
Barbus decioi <small>[[*|Fowler]], 1958</small>Barbus nicholsi Vinciguerra, 1928Barbus squamosissimus Steindachner, 1912Barbus treadwelli Pellegrin, 1933
}}
The zigzag barb (Enteromius miolepis) is a species of cyprinid fish in the genus Enteromius'' which occurs in the Congo Basin, Okavango River, Kafue River and the upper Zambezi.

Footnotes 

 

zigzag barb
Fish of Zambia
Taxa named by George Albert Boulenger
zigzag barb